The Gang Buster is a 1931 American Pre-Code comedy film directed by A. Edward Sutherland, and written by Percy Heath and Joseph L. Mankiewicz. The film stars Jack Oakie, Jean Arthur, William "Stage" Boyd, Wynne Gibson, William Morris and Francis McDonald. The film was released January 17, 1931, by Paramount Pictures.

Cast
Jack Oakie as 'Cyclone' Case
Jean Arthur as Sylvia Martine
William "Stage" Boyd as Mike Slade
Wynne Gibson as Zella Cameron
William Morris as Andrew Martine
Francis McDonald as Pete Caltek

References

External links
 

1931 films
1930s crime comedy films
American crime comedy films
American black-and-white films
Films directed by A. Edward Sutherland
Paramount Pictures films
1930s English-language films
1930s American films